The 19th Punjab Infantry could refer to the:

19th Punjabis were the 19th Punjab Infantry in 1901
27th Punjabis were the 19th Punjab Infantry in 1857